Shannon Denise Bobbitt (born December 6, 1985) is an American professional basketball player, most recently for the WNBA's Washington Mystics. One of eight children and a native of the Bronx, New Yorker Bobbitt honed her basketball skills on the neighborhood project courts of Harlem. Following a stellar college career in which 5'2" Bobbitt won two Division I national titles at the University of Tennessee, she decided to enter the WNBA and began her professional basketball career playing point guard for the Los Angeles Sparks.

High school 

Bobbitt attended Murry Bergtraum High School in New York, where she helped lead her team to two straight PSAL and State Federation titles.  As a sophomore, she gained attention for her basketball skills, city rankings had her listed as the second-best player. During her junior season, her team went undefeated posting a record of 30–0 before winning the national high school championship. She finished her high school career by helping her team post a 29–1 record which was good for third in the nation.

Junior college 
The guard decided Junior College was her best option out of high school, so she chose Trinity Valley Community College in Athens, Texas because they had just won a national title. During the 2005–06 season, Bobbitt handed out 211 assists to rank third in the nation in assists broke the 22-year-old school record at Trinity Valley for her career in that category. She led Trinity Valley to the NJCAA National Tournament and the 2006 Region XIV Championship with a 30–2 record overall and 18–0 mark in conference play. Bobbitt was the 2006 Women's Basketball Coaches Association Junior College Player of the Year.

Division I 
Bobbitt help guide the Volunteers to the regular-season SEC title in 2006–2007. Bobbitt's play was also key in ending the nine-year UT title drought, as the Volunteers defeated Rutgers for the National Championship on April 3, 2007. Bobbitt was named to the All-Tournament team.

The defending champions successfully defended their title in 2007–2008, again behind their point guard, who guided them to a title by defeating Stanford on April 8, 2008.

She graduated with Candace Parker of the Los Angeles Sparks and Alexis Hornbuckle of the Detroit Shock and Nicky Anosike of the Minnesota Lynx.

Tennessee statistics
Source

WNBA 
Bobbitt was the 15th pick in the 2008 WNBA draft on April 9, as the Sparks made her the first pick in the second round. Bobbitt joins teammate Candace Parker and former college teammate Sidney Spencer on the Los Angeles squad, which also features Olympian Lisa Leslie.

On July 22, 2008, Bobbitt and her teammates were involved in a skirmish with the Detroit Shock. The fight broke out at The Palace of Auburn Hills with 4.6 seconds left in the game, the game ended with the LA Sparks winning. The WNBA suspended a total of 10 players and Detroit assistant coach Rick Mahorn. Bobbitt received an in-game technical and was later suspended two games for leaving the bench.

She played for Botas in Turkey during the 2008–09 WNBA off-season. On May 14, 2010, The Sparks waived Shannon Bobbitt.

References

External links 
 WNBA former player profile page: Shannon Bobbitt
 WNBA Profile Page: Shannon Bobbitt
 Pat Summitt and The Tennessee Lady Vols
 consecutive NCAA championships usatoday.com

1985 births
Living people
American expatriate basketball people in Turkey
American women's basketball players
Basketball players from New York City
Botaş SK players
Indiana Fever players
Los Angeles Sparks draft picks
Los Angeles Sparks players
Murry Bergtraum High School alumni
Point guards
Sportspeople from the Bronx
Tennessee Lady Volunteers basketball players
Trinity Valley Cardinals women's basketball players
Washington Mystics players